Afghanistan competed at the 1988 Summer Olympics with five committees in Seoul, after having boycotted the 1984 Summer Olympics in Los Angeles. In total, Afghanistan has completed in 14 Olympic games, none of which included Winter sports after making their initial appearance in 1936.

Competitors
The following is the list of number of competitors in the Games.

Wrestling

Men's Freestyle

References

Official Olympic Reports

Nations at the 1988 Summer Olympics
1988
1988 in Afghan sport